Petrona Eyle (18 January 1866, Baradero, Argentina – 12 April 1945, Buenos Aires) was an Argentine physician and feminist who campaigned for Latin American women's rights.

Early life
Eyle was the daughter of first-generation Swiss immigrants who settled in central Buenos Aires Province between 1856 and 1860.  Beneficiaries of a program that distributed land to immigrants, the Eyle family settled around Baradero, where Eyle was born.  

In 1886, Eyle graduated from the Colegio Nacional de Concepción del Uruguay and received the degree of maestra normal.  Today, a wing of the library there is named after Eyle.  In 1887, Eyle went to Switzerland, where she attended medical school.  She graduated in 1891 at the age of 25; her thesis, written in German and English, was entitled "Anomalies of the ears of criminals" ("Anomalías de las orejas de los delincuentes").

Activism
In 1893, she returned to Argentina, where she worked in public hospitals.  There, she began her career as a feminist activist, campaigning in favor of improving the situation of women.  Such was the male domination of Argentine society that her activism was not well-received even by most women.

Eyle organized the Consejo Argentino de Mujeres (Argentine Council of Women ) in 1901 and the Asociación Universitarias argentinas (Association of Women Argentine University Students) in 1910 with Cecilia Grierson.  Taking advantage of the centennial celebrations of the May Revolution in 1910, Eyle organized the First International Feminist Congress (Primer Congreso Feminista Internacional) in Buenos Aires, which was a resounding success.

The Association of Women Argentine University Students proposed numerous laws in congress, on topics such as the Protection of Motherhood (1903), Health and Welfare (1906), Retirement of Teachers (1907), and Equal Civil Rights for Women (1919).

In 1924 she founded the Liga contra la trata de blancas (League Against White Slavery).  At the time, the League of Nations had begun to take on the problem of human trafficking with an international conference on the topic of "white slavery".  (The name of the League of Nations project was later changed to be racially neutral.)

Eyle, as president of the League, campaigned for the rights of children, in particular in terms of exploitative labor and early pregnancies resulting from sexual abuse or prostitution.

In 1945, she started the magazine Nuestra causa (Our Cause) and became its first director.  Through this publication, she campaigned for the right of women to vote, be actively involved in politics, and hold public office.  Two years later, in 1947, Argentine women in fact, gained the right to vote.

Tribute 
A street in the Puerto Madero neighborhood of Buenos Aires is named in Eyle's honor.

On January 18, 2021, Google celebrated her 155th birthday with a Google Doodle.

References

1866 births
1945 deaths
Argentine feminists
Argentine women activists
Argentine people of Swiss descent
Argentine women physicians
People from Baradero